Statistics of Mestaruussarja in the 1981 season.

Overview
Preliminary Stage is performed in 12 teams, and higher 8 teams go into Championship Group. Lower 4 teams fought in promotion/relegation group with higher 4 teams of Ykkönen.

HJK Helsinki won the championship.

Preliminary stage

Table

Results

Championship group

Table

The points were halved (rounded upwards in uneven cases) after the preliminary stage.

Results

Promotion and relegation group

Table

The teams obtained bonus points on the basis of their preliminary stage position.

Results

References
Finland - List of final tables (RSSSF)

Mestaruussarja seasons
Fin
Fin
1